Thank You, Natercia (French: Merci Natercia!) is a 1963 French drama film directed by Pierre Kast and starring Clara D'Ovar, Pierre Vaneck and Pierre Dudan.

Cast
 Clara D'Ovar as Natércia  
 Pierre Vaneck as Alain  
 Pierre Dudan as Lambert 
 François Maistre as L'avoué  
 Alexandra Stewart as Sandra  
 Ursula Kubler as Olga  
 Peter Oser as Mário  
 Françoise Prévost as Françoise 
 José Quaglio as Claude  
 Ginette Pigeon as Sylvie  
 Françoise Thibaut as Marie-Pierre 
 Bernard Andrieu as Armand  
 Anne-Marie Baumann as Anna  
 Sacha Briquet as Jacques  
 Jean Saudray 
 Jean-Marie Arnoux as Petit rôle  
 Florence Blot as Petit rôle 
 Raymond Bour as Petit rôle  
 André Chanu as Le père d'Alain  
 Jacques Ciron as Petit rôle  
 Liberto Condé as Petit rôle 
 Hubert de Lapparent 
 Marie-Christine Desouches as Petit rôle  
 Yvette Etiévant 
 Pierre Even as Petit rôle  
 Michel Fontayne as Petit rôle  
 Carole Grove as Petit rôle  
 Pierre Hatet as Petit rôle  
 Jacques Hilling as Petit rôle  
 Marie-Luce Jamagne as Petit rôle 
 Claude Mahias as L'amant d'Olga 
 Seda Maliane as Seda  
 Liane Marelli as Petit rôle 
 Manuel Marquez as Petit rôle  
 Jean-Marie Riviière as Petit rôle  
 Serge Sauvion as Bit part 
 Dias Simoes as Le chanteur portugais  
 Mario Sylvestre as Petit rôle  
 Rolande Tisseyre as Macha  
 Bernard Winckler as Petit rôle

References

Bibliography 
 Michel Marie. The French New Wave: An Artistic School. John Wiley & Sons, 2008.

External links 
 

1963 films
1963 drama films
French drama films
1960s French-language films
Films directed by Pierre Kast
1960s French films